This is a list of electoral results for the electoral district of Carpentaria in Queensland state elections.

Members for Carpentaria

The following people were elected in the seat of Carpentaria:

Election results

Elections in the 1950s

Elections in the 1940s

Elections in the 1930s

References

Queensland state electoral results by district